María del Carmen Machín y Ortiz de Zárate (d. 1878), was a Spanish courtier.  

She was the lady-in-waiting and the royal governess of Isabella II of Spain and her sister Luisa, and in the next generation, the royal governess of Alfonso XII.

References

1878 deaths
Spanish ladies-in-waiting
Royal governesses
19th-century Spanish women